Alfred James Whittle Jr. (February 23, 1924 – May 18, 1993) was an admiral in the United States Navy.

Whittle graduated from the United States Naval Academy in June 1945. He was Chief of Naval Material from 1978 to 1981. Awards and decorations he received include the Navy Distinguished Service Medal, Legion of Merit and Meritorious Service Medal.

He died of cancer in 1993.

References

United States Navy admirals
1924 births
1993 deaths
People from Mount Vernon, New York
United States Naval Academy alumni